Still in Love with You may refer to: 

 Still in Love with You (album), a 1992 album from Meli'sa Morgan
 "Still in Love with You" (Anna Vissi song), 2001
 "Still in Love with You" (Dragon song), 1978
 "Still in Love with You" (Electro Velvet song), 2015
 "Still in Love with You" (No Angels song), 2002
 "Still in Love with You" (Thin Lizzy song), 1974
 "Still in Love with You" (Travis Tritt song), 1997
 "Still in Love With You", a 1991 song by Brooks & Dunn from the album Brand New Man
 "Still in Love with You", a song by Karen Carpenter released on the 1996 posthumous solo album Karen Carpenter
 "I'm Still in Love with You Boy", a 1977 song by Marcia Aitken

See also
 I'm Still in Love with You (disambiguation)